Dianne Sika–Paotonu is a New Zealand immunologist, biomedical scientist and academic in the Department of Pathology and Molecular Medicine and Associate Dean (Pacific) at the University of Otago Wellington. She is of Tongan descent and is the first Pasifika biomedical scientist to receive the Cranwell Medal for science communication.

Early life and education 
Sika–Paotonu was born in New Zealand to Tongan parents who emigrated to New Zealand from Tonga in the 1960s. She has one brother. She attended Cannons Creek Primary School, the Wellington Seventh Day Adventist school and Wellington Girls' College. She studied at Victoria University of Wellington where she gained a BSc in physiology in 2001, a Bachelor of Biomedical Science in molecular pathology in 2003, a Masters in Biomedical Science in 2007 and a PhD. Her PhD thesis, completed in 2014, was titled Increasing the potency of dendritic cell based vaccines for the treatment of cancer.

Career 
Sika–Paotonu completed her PhD while working on cancer vaccines at the Malaghan Institute of Medical Research in Wellington. From her work on vaccines she moved into investigating cancer diagnosis and the early detection of cancer. She has been researching the treatment of rheumatic fever, in particular long–lasting penicillin and is the scientific lead of the Rheumatic Fever and Penicillin Research Programme. She has raised issues of concern about missed diagnoses of rheumatic fever during the COVID-19 pandemic.

Her research into the early detection of cancer using a blood test was funded by a Sir Thomas Davis Te Patu Kite Rangi Ariki Fellowship in 2018. In 2020 she received a Fulbright Scholarship to travel to Harvard University and the University of Oklahoma to research rheumatic fever, rheumatic heart disease and early detection of cancer.

Her work extends into health equity issues for Pasifika and Māori communities and mentoring Pasifika students and researchers.

Sika–Paotonu is a senior lecturer in the Department of Pathology and Molecular Medicine and Associate Dean (Pacific) at the University of Otago, Wellington. She is a Health Research Council Pacific Emerging Research Fellow.

Honours and awards 
 MacDiarmid Award (2008)
 NZ Young Scientist Award for advancing Human Health and Wellbeing (medical category) (2008)
 Colmar Brunton NZ Research Excellence Award (2008)
 Australasian Society of Immunology (ASI) Science Communication Award (2008)
 Health Research Council of New Zealand's Sir Thomas Davis Te Patu Kite Rangi Ariki Health Research Fellowship (2018)
 New Zealand Association of Scientists (NZAS) Cranwell Medal for Science communication (2020)
 Association of Adventist Women (AAW) Woman of the Year (2021)
 Fulbright Scholarship (2020)

Personal life 
Sika–Paotonu is married to Reno Paotonu and they have one daughter.

Selected publications

References

External links 
 Interview with Dr Dianne Sika–Paotonu on RNZ, 3 June 2021
 Three experts react to Government's Covid-19 roadmap on YouTube, 5 October 2021 – Dr Dianne Sika–Paotonu, Professor Shaun Hendy and Dr Siouxsie Wiles

Academic staff of the University of Otago
New Zealand people of Tongan descent
New Zealand medical researchers
Living people
Year of birth missing (living people)
Victoria University of Wellington alumni
People educated at Wellington Girls' College
New Zealand academics